Thizy-les-Bourgs is a commune in the Rhône department in Auvergne-Rhône-Alpes region in eastern France. The result of the merger, on 1 January 2013, of the communes of Bourg-de-Thizy, La Chapelle-de-Mardore, Mardore, Marnand and Thizy.

Population
The population data given in the table below refer to the commune in its geography as of January 2020.

See also
Communes of the Rhône department

References

Communes of Rhône (department)
Beaujolais (province)